is a Japanese footballer currently playing as a defender for Tokyo Verdy.

Club career
In September 2021, while studying at the Meiji University, it was announced that Kato would sign for J2 League side Tokyo Verdy for the 2022 season. He would link up with his new team as a designated special player for the duration of the 2021 season.

Career statistics

Club
.

Notes

References

1999 births
Living people
People from Otaru
Association football people from Hokkaido
Meiji University alumni
Japanese footballers
Association football defenders
J2 League players
Hokkaido Consadole Sapporo players
Tokyo Verdy players